Hippotion rosae is a moth of the family Sphingidae first described by Arthur Gardiner Butler in 1882. It is found in Africa.

The length of the forewings is 40–43 mm for males and 41–45 mm for females and the wingspan is 74–99 mm.

The larvae feed on the leaves of Cissus species.

Subspecies
Hippotion rosae rosae
Hippotion rosae guichardi Carcasson, 1968 (Yemen, Socotra)

References

 Pinhey, E. (1962): Hawk Moths of Central and Southern Africa. Longmans Southern Africa, Cape Town.

Hippotion
Moths described in 1882
Moths of Africa
Moths of the Middle East